Nicky Hill (born 26 February 1981) in Accrington, England, is an English retired professional footballer who played as a defender for Bury in the Football League.

External links

1981 births
Living people
People from Accrington
English footballers
Association football defenders
Bury F.C. players
Leigh Genesis F.C. players
Hyde United F.C. players
English Football League players